Shaoxing is a prefecture-level city on the southern shore of Hangzhou Bay in northeastern Zhejiang province, China. Located on the south bank of the Qiantang River estuary, it borders Ningbo to the east, Taizhou to the southeast, Jinhua to the southwest, and Hangzhou to the west. As of the 2020 census, its population was 5,270,977 inhabitants among which, 2,958,643 (Keqiao, Yuecheng and Shangyu urban districts) lived in the built-up (or metro) area of Hangzhou-Shaoxing, with a total of 13,035,326 inhabitants.

Notable residents of Shaoxing include Wang Xizhi, the parents of Zhou Enlai, Lu Xun, and Cai Yuanpei. It is also noted for Shaoxing wine, meigan cai, and stinky tofu, and was featured on A Bite of China. Its local variety of Chinese opera sung in the local dialect and known as Yue opera is second in popularity only to Peking opera. In 2010, Shaoxing celebrated the 2,500th anniversary of the founding of the city.

Economically, the city is driven by manufacturing of textiles, electronics, and energy-efficient lighting. Zhejiang has the fifth highest per capita GDP in the nation, with the city itself at 32nd  nationally by GDP per capita.

Etymology
The city was first named Shaoxing in 1131 A.D. during the Southern Song dynasty. The name comes from the Shaoxing reign period of Emperor Gaozong of Song, and is a poetic term meaning "inheriting the imperial task and resurging to prosperity".

History

Early history 

Modern-day Shaoxing lies north of the Kuaiji Mountains, which were an important center of the people of Yue during ancient China's Spring and Autumn period. Chinese legend connected them with events in the life of Yu the Great, the founder of the Xia. Around the early 5th century BC, the time of Yue's famous king Goujian, his people began establishing permanent centers in the alluvial plain north of the hills. Following his freedom from captivity in Wu, Goujian commissioned his advisor Fan Li to erect a major triangular fortification in the area of present-day Shaoxing's Yuecheng District. Following Yue's conquest of Wu, though, its royal court was removed to its former rival's capital (present-day Suzhou) until its own conquest by Chu in 334 BC.

Following the area's conquest in 222 BC, the Qin Empire's Kuaiji Commandery was also established in Wu (which then took the name "Kuaiji" from this role) but the First Emperor visited the town in the last year of his reign (210 BC), ascending Mount Kuaiji (present-day Mount Xianglu) and sacrificing to the spirit of Yu. The commemorative stele he erected is now lost but was visited by Sima Qian during his 1st-century BC pilgrimage of China's historical sites and was preserved in his Records of the Grand Historian. By the time of the Later Han, the lands between the Yangtze and Hangzhou Bay received their own commanderies and administration of Kuaiji—then stretching along the south shore of the bay from Qiantang (present-day Hangzhou) to the East China Sea. The area's capital in present-day Yuecheng was then known as Kuaiji until the 12th century, when it was renamed Shaoxing. The present site of Yu's mausoleum dates to the 6th-century Southern Dynasties period.

Ming and Qing Dynasties 
Under the Ming and Qing dynasties, the area was organized as a prefecture containing the following eight counties: urban Kuaiji and Shanyin and rural Yuyao, Zhuji, Xiaoshan, Shangyu, Xinchang, and Cheng (or Sheng). From the later Ming through the Qing, Shaoxing was famous (or notorious) for its network of native sons throughout the Chinese government bureaucracy, cooperating out of native-place loyalty. In addition to the substantial number of Shaoxing natives who succeeded in becoming officials via the regular civil-service examination route, this vertical Shaoxing clique also included county-level jail wardens, plus unofficial legal specialists (muyou) working privately for officials at the county, prefectural, and provincial levels, plus clerks working in Beijing's Six Boards (central administrative offices), especially the Boards of Revenue and Punishment. The legal experts were also known as Shaoxing shiye (Shaoxing masters), and they were indispensable advisers to the local and regional officials who employed them, since their knowledge of the detailed Qing legal code permitted the officials, whose education was in the Confucian Classics, to competently perform one of their major functions, that of judging local civil and criminal cases. Coming from the same gentry social class as the officials, the legal experts were expected to adhere to the ethical dictum enunciated by Wang Huizu, Shaoxing's most famous muyou: "If not in accord [with your employer], then leave" (Bu he ze qu).

During the Taiping Rebellion Shaoxing was home to a local militia leader named Bao Lisheng who organized an armed resistance to the Taiping army in his home village of Baochun. Bao was a martial arts expert and recruited thousands of people from the surrounding area to his cause by convincing them he had supernatural powers. However, after a months-long siege, Baochun was captured by the Taiping.

People's Republic of China 
Under the Republic of China during the early 20th century, the prefecture was abolished and the name Shaoxing was applied to a new county comprising the former Shanyin and Kuaiji. Currently, Shaoxing is a municipality with a somewhat smaller land area than its Ming-Qing namesake prefecture, having lost Xiaoshan county to Hangzhou on the west and Yuyao county to Ningbo on the east.

Climate

Administration
The prefecture-level city of Shaoxing administers three districts, two county-level cities and one county.

Sights at downtown

There are a number of historical places connected with the writer Lu Xun:

 Lu Xun Native Place near the centre of the city.
 Xianheng Hotel, founded in 1894, mentioned in works by the novelist. In front of the gate is a statue of Kong Yiji, a character in one of his stories. 
 Sanwei School, built around 1890, at the end of the Qing Dynasty. It was used by the Zhou clan. The writer was born there and grew up in the house, where he studied both western economics and literature as well as Chinese subjects. After he returned to China, he turned it into a primary school, believing that education could inspire national regeneration. He introduced advanced ideas, and technical knowledge to provide opportunities for children in Shaoxing.
 Baicao Garden

Historical sites:

 Mount Fu, also called Mount Wolong: Palace of King Yue, Stadium of King Yue, King Yue (~520–465 BC) lived there for 19 years. Tomb of WenZhong, the right minister of King Yue. Spring of Innocence discovered and named by Fan Zhongyan, one of the most famous philosopher and poet during his one-year commissioner in the State of Yue. Old dragon Spruce said was planted by Emperor Zhao Gou in South Song Dynasty. 
 Shen Garden, in Yan'an Road, associated with the poet Lu You and his love for his first wife Tang Wan. The garden dates back to the Southern Song Dynasty.
 Green Vine Studio, former home of the Ming period painter and calligrapher Xu Wei.
 Qiu Jin's House, Qing period.
 Zhou Enlai's ancestral home, Ming period.

Suburban sites

 Tomb of Yu the Great, legendary founder of the Xia Dynasty.
 Orchid Pavilion, commemorating the one of the most famous calligrapher, general Wang Xizhi and his famous work Lantingji Xu, written in Shaoxing in 353 AD.
 , scenic area outside the city.
 Tomb of Wang Yangming (1472–1529), general, and Neo–Confucian philosopher. Located on S308, South of Lanting.
 Keyan Scenic Area, a natural scenery scenic park located in the Keqiao section of Shaoxing City.

Special events 
Shaoxing was the location of the official world choir games in 2010. It also hosted the world Korfball championship in late October 2011.

Shaoxing wine 

 Chinese rice wine is also known as Shaoxing wine or simply Shao Wine. The brewery utilizes a natural process using the "pure" water of the Jianhu-Mirror Lake. It has a unique flavour and a reputation both nationally and internationally. It is used as a liquor and in cooking as well as a solvent for Chinese herbal medicated ointments. The China Shaoxing Yellow Wine Group Corporation produces 110,000 tons annually for domestic and overseas markets.

Zhufu folk customs

Due to its long history, Shaoxing has accumulated and handed down a characteristic culture known as "Yue Culture". As an important part of Yue Culture and a traditional folk custom of Shaoxing, Zhufu still has great influence on Shaoxing people and their lives.

History and background
Zhufu is also called Zuofu and is the most prominent annual sacrificial ceremony in Shaoxing. The gods worshipped are Nanchao Shengzhong and Huangshan Xinan. They have been worshipped since the Yuan Dynasty (1279-1368 CE). Legend holds that when the government of the Song Dynasty (960-1279 CE) was overthrown by the Mongolian army and replaced by the Yuan Dynasty, the original Song citizens, namely the Han people, were extremely afraid of the newly established minority political power. They secretly offered sacrifices at midnight to the emperors of South Song Dynasty and those patriotic martyrs who died to save the nation.

Nanchao Shengzhong refers to a group of martyrs, who died in the war of resistance against the Mongolian invasion, including Emperor Huaizong of Song, last emperor of the Southern Song Dynasty, Wen Tianxiang, scholar-general of Southern Song Dynasty, who was captured but didn't give in to the enemy and later was killed by the Yuan Government, and Lu Xiufu, the Southern Song Prime Minister who committed suicide, together with Emperor Huaizong and 800 other officials and members of the imperial court. Huangshan Xinan refers to two anonymous brothers who sacrificed their lives to save civilians from being killed by the Mongolian army. In memory of the brothers, the local people named the place where they were killed after them and offered sacrifice to a portrait or statue of the brothers.

Records show that the Mongolian nobility, the ruling class of the Yuan Dynasty, treated the Han people harshly, such that the Han people created and cleverly disguised their gods Nanchao Shengzhong and Huangshan Xinan in order to mourn for the lost nation and its patriotic martyrs whilst praying for their blessing. The ruling class knew only of the ostensible purpose of the annual sacrificial ceremony, believing it was the means to entertain the God of Blessing and pray for a good harvest the next year as well as harmony. The ceremony was handed down from generation to generation and finally became a convention whilst its political meaning gradually dimmed. It became a pure sacrificial ceremony, held annually to offer thanks to the God of Blessing for all his blessings and to pray for the next year's blessing.

Dates
Zhufu is often held during the period between December 24 and December 28 according to the Chinese lunar calendar. Shaoxing people first choose an auspicious day according to the Chinese lunar calendar to hold the ceremony. In Shaoxing, the days between December 20 and December 30 of the Chinese lunar calendar are called nights instead of days so as to remind homemakers that the Spring Festival is approaching and they should hurry up to prepare for Zhufu and the Spring Festival.

Ceremonial rite
Thereafter, the officiant of the ceremony who is usually the man of the house, lights incense and red candles, hangs golden and silver Taiding made of paper on the left and right candleholders, puts cushions for kneeling on the ground in order, and inserts a Mazhang Stick, which represents Nanchao Shengzhong or Huangshan Xinan into the prepared holder. Females are not allowed to be present whilst the sacrifice is underway. After tasks are completed, the male members of the family successively kneel down facing the main door and kowtow to the god. At that moment there are many taboos. For example, the wine should not be poured from a cup, and chopsticks should not fall into the ground. Silence is also maintained to avoid taboos.

When all is prepared, the officiant pours wine for those present. They hold their wine cups high as quickly as possible to see the god out. Then the officiant burns the Mazhang Stick together with golden and silver Taiding in the courtyard. He cuts the tongues from the chicken and goose then throws them on to the roof of the house at the same time and praying to the god to take away the tongues which symbolize possible calamities emanating from the spoken word. Finally, the officiant put a cup of wine with tea onto the ashes of Mazhang Stick signifying the end of Zhufu. Ancestor worship follows the ceremony and, although similar to Zhufu, differences do exist. After worship, the family sits down at tables and eat Fuli together, which they call Sanfu or sharing the blessings.

As a featured folk custom, Zhufu has been handed down and well protected as part of Shaoxing's cultural heritage. It is reputable because of its special origin. It was widely popularized by Lu Xun (1881-1936, Shaoxing-born) in his short story , which he named after the sacrificial ceremony.  Whilst deeply moved by the ill-fated leading character of the novel, readers get to learn the details of the Zhufu tradition.

Notable people

 Yu the Great ~ 2123 – 2025 BC, a legendary ruler in ancient China who was famed for his introduction of flood control, his establishment of the Xia dynasty which inaugurated dynastic rule in China, and his upright moral character. Died and buried in Shaoxing.
 Gou Jian ~520BC-465BC, King of Yue Kingdom.
 Fan Li 536-448BC, Politician, Philosopher, Military theorist, and Economist, helped King Yue conquer Wu. 
 Xi Shi 506 BC–?, one of the Four Beauties of ancient China, who was born and lived in Zhuji county, Shaoxing.
 Wang Xizhi, 303–361, one of the most famous calligrapher, lived in Shaoxing.
 Lu You, 1125–1209, poet and literati of the Southern Song period, who famously encountered his former wife in Shen Garden.
 Xu Wei, 1521–1593, Ming dynasty painter, born in Shaoxing.
 Wang Shouren, 1472–1529, Ming dynasty politician and scholar. 
 Liu Zongzhou 1578–1645, also known as Jishan, later Ming politician and scholar, born in Shaoxing.
 Zhang Dai, 1597–1684, essayist and historian of the later Ming period, born in Shaoxing.
 Cai Yuanpei, 1868–1940, educator and thinker, born in Shaoxing.
 Qiu Jin, 1875–1907, feminist republican revolutionary, raised in Shaoxing.
 Lu Xun, (aka Zhou Shuren) 1881–1936, writer, leading figure of modern Chinese literature, born in Shaoxing.
 Ma Yinchu, 1882–1982, educator and economist, born in Shengzhou, Shaoxing.
 Chen Yi, 1883–1950, Kuomintang soldier and politician, born in Dongpuzhen, Shaoxing.
 Zhou Zuoren, 1885–1967, essayist and translator, brother of Lu Xun, born in Shaoxing.
 Chu Kochen, 1890–1974, meteorologist, geographer, and educator, born in Shaoxing
 Zhou Enlai, 1898–1976, first Premier of the People's Republic of China, family ancestral roots in Shaoxing
 Zhao Zhongyao, 1902–1998, theoretical physicist.
 Wong Tin Lam, 1927–2010, Hong Kong screenwriter, producer, director, and actor, father of Wong Jing.
 Tong Jinquan, 1954–, real estate billionaire
 Dai Xiangyu, 1984–, actor.
 Zhou Quan, 1987–, film director and producer.

See also 
 Jiangnan
 Shaoxing Metro

References

External links 

 Shaoxing air quality index reports

 
Cities in Zhejiang
Prefecture-level divisions of Zhejiang
Yangtze River Delta